Kotvrdovice is a municipality and village in Blansko District in the South Moravian Region of the Czech Republic. It has about 900 inhabitants.

Twin towns – sister cities

Kotvrdovice is twinned with:
 Aschheim, Germany

References

External links

 

Villages in Blansko District